The .375 Winchester is a modernized version of the .38-55 Winchester, a black powder cartridge from 1884. It was introduced in 1978 along with the Winchester Model 94 “Big Bore” lever action rifle.

Though very similar in appearance to the .38-55 Winchester parent cartridge, the .375 Winchester cartridge has a shorter case length and operates at a higher chamber pressure of 52,000 CUP or 55,000 psi (380 MPa), compared to the .38-55 Winchester cartridge which has a longer case length and operates at a lower chamber pressure of 30,000 CUP or 35,000 psi (240 MPa).

The most commonly used bullet weights for the .375 Winchester are between 180 gr to 260 gr (11.7 g to 16.9 g) and has been used on a variety of medium to large game species such as whitetail, pronghorn, caribou, elk, moose, black bear, and brown bear.

See also
List of rifle cartridges
.360 Buckhammer
.38-55 Winchester

References

 Hodgdon Online Reloading Data

External links
 Winchester Medium Bore Lever Action Rifles
 375 Winchester

Pistol and rifle cartridges
Winchester Repeating Arms Company cartridges